Tamale (Dagbani), officially called Tamale Metropolitan Area is the capital city of the Northern Region of Ghana. Tamale is Ghana's third largest city. It has a projected population of 950,124 according to the Tamale Metropolitan Assembly Official Website. It is the fastest-growing city in West Africa.
Most residents of Tamale are Muslims and Dagombas by tribe, as reflected by the multitude of mosques in Tamale, most notably the Central Mosque, Afa Ajura Mosque (Ambariyyah Mosque), Afa Basha mosque (Nuuria mosque) and The Ahmadiyyah Muslim mission Mosque.

Tamale is located in the Northern Region of Ghana and more precisely in the Kingdom of Dagbon. The local (neighbourhood) chiefs and the district chief of Tamale are subservient to the Dagomba King in Yendi.The language of the people in Tamale is Dagbani.

Due to its central location, Tamale serves as a hub for all administrative and commercial activities in the Northern Region, doubling as the political, economic and financial capital of the Northern Region. The centre of Tamale hosts regional branches of financial institutions and a considerable number of international and local nongovernmental organisations.

Tamale has developed and transformed significantly in the last few years. The new dimension of Tamale's development is the rush by various companies to open branches in Tamale. The hospitality industry has grown significantly, with new hotels and guest houses built around Tamale. Tamale grew from a conglomeration of towns where one could find an architectural blend of traditional mud houses and more modern buildings. Tamale's new and modern facilities include the newly constructed Tamale Stadium (now Aliu Mahama sports Stadium named after late Ghana's vice-president, Alhaji Aliu Mahama), replacing the town's former principal football pitch, Kaladan Park, with a world-class venue. Indeed, many improvements to Tamale's infrastructure occurred in the period leading up to the 2008 African Cup of Nations tournament. Further improvements were made, particularly to Tamale's road system. The Tamale sports stadium was renamed after the late Vice president, Alhaji Aliu Mahama in the year 2018. Upon arriving in the city, one will be quick to notice that the roads of the city are occupied with motorcycles with "mapukas" being the most patronised. This, however, does not interfere with the steady smooth flow of traffic on the major roads of the city.

History

Tamale is located on the crossing of three ancient trade routes; it started to grow as a commercial centre for the Northern region centuries ago. The north–south road from Paga and Bolgatanga to Salaga had raiders passing, whilst other merchants brought their goods into Tamale. Salt came from Daboya, to the north-west of Tamale, and followed a road that continued to Yendi. A third road linked Gushegu to the capital and continued to the Gonja kingdom, Damongo. The present locations of the central market and the palace of the Gulkpe naa, opposite Barclays Bank and near the library, mark the junctions of the ancient roads.

Around this palace, a residential neighbourhood began to grow. It is now known as Dagbangdabi-Fong (the name means "Traditional men area"). This was followed by Changli, Belipiela, and BuglanaFong ("Fetish Priest's area") further to the south. Each neighbourhood got its own local chief. As the distances to the market place grew, people started to settle elsewhere around the crossing, so the quarters of Tishigu and Abu-Abu came up. An influx of northerners from present-day Burkina Faso led to the building of Moshi Zongo. In the same time, the remote village of Vitteng came into existence.

Garden cities were brought to Tamale and at the back of Sakasaka grew Kalpohin Estates, even now a pleasant neighbourhood with plenty trees, big gardens, and small houses. In the 1970s, urban extensions such as Zogbeli, Lamakara, and Lamashegu were built, neighbourhoods characterised by checkboard planning of square house plots and orthogonal streets and alleys. Since 2000, Tamale seems to have grown more rapidly, so the whole district of Tamale is now urban agglomeration.

Climate
Tamale features a tropical wet and dry climate under the Köppen's climate classification. The metropolis experiences one rainy season from April to September or October, with a peak in July and August. The mean annual rainfall is 1100 mm within 95 days of rainfall in the form of tropical showers. Consequently, staple crop farming is highly restricted by the short rainy season.

The dry season is usually from November to early April. It is influenced by the dry north-easterly (Harmattan) winds, while the rainy season is influenced by the moist south-westerly winds. The mean daytime temperatures range from 28 (December and mid-April) to 43 (March, early April) degrees Celsius, while mean nighttime temperatures range from 18 (December) to 25 (February, March) degrees Celsius. The mean annual daily sunshine is about 7.5 hours.

Government

Tamale has a mayor–council government system in which the mayor is vested with extensive executive powers. The mayor is appointed by the Ghana president and approved by the town council, the Tamale Metropolitan Assembly, although suggestions have been made by the residents of Tamale to increase accountability of the office by having the mayor elected. The current mayor of Tamale is Hon. Sule Salifu. The name Tamale Metropolitan Assembly serves both for the local parliament and for the local executive. Local policies are always executed in this name, so for example, illegal constructions often show the command "remove by TMA" (meaning that the Tamale Metropolitan Assembly or its executive has ordered to remove the building as it is contrary to current urban land-use planning). As the local executive, Tamale Metropolitan Assembly is the strong arm of the mayor, his or her civil service. If mention is made of assembly women or men, however, the reference is to the elected representatives of the inhabitants of Tamale. They form the assembly properly speaking, and must decide about local by-laws before they can come into force.
The name "Tamale Metropolitan District" is used in the geographical sense, to refer to the area within its borders.

Education

Tamale is the principal centre of education in Northern Ghana. Currently, a total of 742 basic schools are within the metropolis. This comprises 94 kindergartens, 304 primary, 112 junior high, and 14 senior high schools. The rest are technical/vocational institutions, two colleges of education, a technical university and two other universities – one public and the other private.

In the Education Ridge neighbourhood in the north-western part of the town and covering an area around 3 km2, 20 schools ranging from kindergartens through junior high and senior high schools, teachers' training colleges, the Tamale Technical University, and a university are located. The numerous trees lining the streets in this part of the town give it a tropical rainforest outlook. The University for Development Studies (UDS) has two campuses located in Tamale and one in nearby Nyankpala. The headquarters of the UDS is also located in Tamale.

List of Primary Schools 
 Munawara Ahmadiya  E/A Primary School
 OLA Primary School
 Koblimahigu Sobriya E/A Primary School
 Kukuo AME Zion Primary School, Wurishe Kukuo
 Ansuari-Deen Islamic Primary School
 Anbariya Ibnitaimiya English/Arabic Primary School
 Amriya Islamic Primary School, Kakpagyili
 Aminiyat Islamic Primary School, Sawaba
 Amania Islamic Primary/Kg School
 Al-Markazia Islamic Junior High School, Zogbeli
 Al -Mal Islamic Basic Schools, Tamale
 Al-Egasa Islamic Primary School, Kasaligu
 Adubliyili Preby Primary School
 Adabiya Garibiy Islamic Kg/Primary School, Tamale
 Abubakar Sadoq Islamic Primary School, Vittin
 Aalu Ibrahim Islamic Primary School

List of Junior High Schools 
 Munawara Ahmadiya  E/A Junior High School
 Wurishe Kukuo Junior High School
 Koblimahigu Sobriya E/A

List of senior high schools
 Tamale Senior High School
 Ghana Senior High School
 Northern School of Business
 Business Senior High School
 Tamale Girls Senior High School
 Viting Senior High School
 Kalpohin Senior High School
 Tamale Islamic Science Senior High School
 St Charles Minor Seminar Senior High School
 Adventist Senior High School
 Presbyterian Senior High School
 Business College International
 Tamale Girls International School
 Ambariya Senior High School
 Dabokpa Technical and Vocational School
 T- Poly Senior High School
 Abubakar Al-sadiq Senior High School
 Ideal College
 Kasuliyili Senior High school

List of Colleges and Universities 
 Bagabaga College of Education
 Tamale College of Education
 Jackson College of Education
 University for Development Studies
 Tamale Technical University
 Technical University College of Tamale

List of Driving Schools 
 Johnson Driving School
 Abele Driving School

Transportation
Tamale is served by Tamale Airport. They run regular flights between Tamale and Accra's Kotoka International Airport, along with other regional capitals.

There are Public Transports from Tamale to major citie such as Kumasi; Accra, Mim, Ahafo ; Cape Coast, Sunyani; Takoradi; Tema; Ho; Wa; Bolgatanga; Elubo; Aflao, Techiman;
Public transportation 
in the form of taxis used to be the most convenient means of getting around Tamale for visitors to the town until the arrival of the Tri-cycles, popularly called "Mahama-Cambuu" or yellow-yellow. Mahama Cambuu is a coined name by the local people from the expression "Mahama can do". This is because these Tri-cycles (mostly yellow in color) came in the era of the former president, H.E John Dramani Mahama. It is comparatively cheaper than the Taxis and usually on the move unlike the Taxis that are regularized and stationed at a points. It is however, not very safe compared to the Taxis. The popular means of travel for the locals, however, is by motorbike. This phenomenon is helped by the existence of bike paths in the town, making it one of the most bike-friendly settlements in the Northern region. Transportation out of town is facilitated by the Tamale's bus rapid transit system, tro-tro private mini-bus system, MetroMass Bus-Based Mass Transit system, and STC Bus Lines, along with a host of charter bus companies, all of which provide transport to connect Tamale with the many other surrounding towns and cities.

Gallery

Sister cities
Tamale has sister city relations with:

Key Landmarks 

 Tamale Central Mosque
 Dakpema Chief's Palace
 Aliu Mahama Sports Stadium
 Tamale Jubilee Park

Notable people
Mubarak Wakaso (born 1990), professional footballer
Haruna Iddrisu (born 1970), Member of Parliament for Tamale South and the former Minister for Employment and Labour Relations in Ghana, Minority leader of Parliament
Abdul Majeed Waris (born 1991), professional footballer
Fancy Gadam (born 1988), Afro-pop and dancehall artiste
Alhassan Yahaya Seini, barrister and director of the Legal Aid Commission
Mahamudu Bawumia (born 1963), politician
Sheikh Bayan Basha
Sheikh Saeed
Chief Gupkenaa
Chief Dakpema
 Alhassan Suhiyini (member of Parliament for Tamale-North constituency). 
 Inusah Fuseini (a former member of Parliament for Tamale-Central constituency)
Alhassan Bashir Fuseini (member of Parliament for Sagnarigu constituency). 
Anyars Ibrahim (Ceo of Nation's builders corps).
Mona 4Reall, (born 1993) Socialite, model, musician, and businesswoman

Ongoing Projects 

 The Tamale Interchange. Which is about 80% complete. It is hoped that the project will be fully completed by the end of 2021.
 Tamale International Airport. Phase II is in progress.

Communities in Tamale 

 Lamashegu
 Zogbeli
 Kakpagyili
 Zujung
 Vitting
 Kukuo
 Kanvilli
 Gumani
 Jisonayili
 Gurugu
 Dungu
 Bamvim
 Bulpeila
 Sabonjida
 Sakasaka
 Tishigu
 malishegu
 Nyanshegu
 Kalpohini
 Dabokpa
 Choggu
 Kalariga
 Katariga
 Tuutingli
 Zagyuri
 Sagnarigu
 Yapalsi
 Sognayili
 Kpalsi
 Wurishe
 Changli
 Fuo
 Kunyevula
 Guunayili
 Aboabo
 Gumbihini

Hotels and Guest Houses in Tamale 
1. Picona Hotel

2. Radarch Lodge and Conference Centre
 
3. Miricha Hotel

4. Nim Avenue

5. Modern City Hotel

6. Sabonkudi estates

7. Regal hotel

8. Target Hills hotel

9. Pioneer lodge

10. B Sheini hotel

11. Naat guesthouse

12. Ganaa hotel

13. Global dream hotel

References

External links

 Official website of the Tamale Metropolitan Assembly
 Official Tamale Senior High Page
 Official UDS website

 
Regional capitals in Ghana
Populated places in the Northern Region (Ghana)
Dagbon